Sosnovo-Ozerskoye (Narhata) is a rural locality (a selo) and the administrative center of Yeravninsky District of the Republic of Buryatia, Russia. Population:

Geography 
It is located by the Lake Sosnovo, part of the Yeravna-Khorga Lake System.

References

Notes

Sources

Rural localities in Yeravninsky District